Invasion From Outer Space is a 1980 video game designed by Chris Freund for The Software Exchange for the TRS-80 16K Level II microcomputer.

Plot summary
Invasion From Outer Space is a game in which the player destroys as many alien ships as possible before losing all available bases.

Reception
Joseph T. Suchar reviewed Invasion From Outer Space (as "Alien Invaders") in The Space Gamer No. 30. Suchar commented that "This game involves no real strategy, but will provide a great deal of excitement and frustration, depending upon your temperament. If you are an arcade game fan, I highly recommend this game."

References

External links
Review in 80 Micro

1980 video games
TRS-80 games
TRS-80-only games
Video games developed in the United States